Thomas Trenchard, 2nd Viscount Trenchard MC (15 December 1923 – 29 April 1987) was a hereditary peer and junior minister in Margaret Thatcher's Conservative government from 1979 to 1983.

Thomas Trenchard was born in 1923, the son of Katherine and Hugh Trenchard, whom many regard as the father of the Royal Air Force. He was educated at Eton College and served in the King's Royal Rifle Corps in World War II being awarded the MC in 1945.

On 19 June 1948, Thomas Trenchard married Patricia Bailey, the daughter of Admiral Sir Sidney Robert Bailey.

They had three children:

 Hon Hugh Trenchard (b. 12 March 1951), later 3rd Viscount Trenchard;
 Hon John Trenchard (b. 13 March 1953) who married Clare Marsh (youngest daughter of Edward Chandos de Burgh Marsh, of The Old Rectory, Salcott, Essex) in 1983, and has issue (one son and one daughter); and
 Hon Thomas Henry Trenchard (16 July 1966 – 23 February 2003) who married Sarah Saunders in 1997, and had one daughter.

He succeeded his father as second Viscount Trenchard on 10 February 1956, and took his seat in the House of Lords on 28 February 1957. He was subsequently a Director of Unilever Ltd and Unilever NV from 1967 to 1977 and served as a Minister of State, Department of Industry from 1979 to 1981 and as Minister for Defence Procurement from 1981 to 1983. After this, he became president of Women and Families for Defence, an anti-CND group.

Lord Trenchard died on 29 Apr 1987 and was succeeded by his eldest son Hugh. Lady Trenchard died in 2016 at the age of 90. They are buried together in the churchyard at North Mymms, Hertfordshire.

References

1923 births
1987 deaths
British Army personnel of World War II
Conservative Party (UK) hereditary peers
King's Royal Rifle Corps officers
People educated at Eton College
Recipients of the Military Cross
Viscounts in the Peerage of the United Kingdom